The 1897 VPI football team represented Virginia Agricultural and Mechanical College and Polytechnic Institute in the 1897 college football season. The team was led by their head coach Charles Firth and finished with a record of five wins and two losses (5–2).

Schedule

Players
The following players were members of the 1897 football team according to the roster published in the 1898 and 1903 editions of The Bugle, the Virginia Tech yearbook.

References

VPI
Virginia Tech Hokies football seasons
VPI football